Mannava Sri Kanth Prasad  (born 24 April 1975) is a retired Indian cricketer. He was most recently the chief selector of the Indian National Cricket Team and lead the selection of the Indian team for the 2019 Cricket World Cup. He played six Test matches and 17 One Day Internationals in his professional career.

Early life and career
Prasad was born in Medikonduru, in the Guntur district of Andhra Pradesh, India, to a middle-class family. He started his cricket career with the Andhra Pradesh Ranji team. He made his international debut with the India-A Team during the bilateral cricket series with Pakistan-A in 1997–98. He got a lucky break in the 1999 Cricket World Cup when the regular wicketkeeper Nayan Mongia got injured. In 1999–2000, he played six test matches - three each against Australia and New Zealand. However, after this his form dipped and he averaged only 8 runs with the bat. His continued batting failures led to the end of his career. In the six Test matches he played, Prasad scored just 106 runs at an average of 11.78. In the 17 ODIs, he scored 131 runs at an average below 15, with only one half-century in the process. That ended his brief international career.

National selector
On 21 September 2016, MSK Prasad was appointed as Chief National Selector of the Indian men's cricket team by BCCI. His tenure as Chief Selector ended on 4 March 2020.

References

1975 births
Living people
India One Day International cricketers
India Test cricketers
Indian cricketers
South Zone cricketers
Andhra cricketers
Cricketers at the 1998 Commonwealth Games
India national cricket team selectors
Cricketers from Guntur
Commonwealth Games competitors for India
Wicket-keepers